The 1991–92 Albanian National Championship was the 53rd season of the Albanian National Championship, the top professional league for association football clubs, since its establishment in 1930. The season began on 21 September 1991 and concluded on 17 May 1992. Flamurtari began the season as defending champions of the 1990–91 season, with Laçi, Pogradeci and Selenica being promoted from the Kategoria e Dytë as the league was expanded from 14 to 16 teams and the total number of fixtures reduced for the 1991–92 season, as clubs faced each twice rather than 3 times.

Vllaznia won their 7th Albanian title, having finished 3rd the previous season, with the defending champions finishing 6th following a 6-point deduction. Skënderbeu were the first club to be relegated, with newly promoted side Selenica following them down to the Kategoria e Dytë.

Teams

Promotion and relegation
A total of 16 teams competed in the 1991–92 season, 2 more than the previous where 14 teams competed. Of these 16 teams, 13 of them were from the 1990–91 season with Laçi, Pogradeci and Selenica being promoted from the Kategoria e Dytë. 2 sides from the 1991–92 season were relegated, and they were SkënderbeuSelenica. Skënderbeu were the first to be relegated, and Selenica were subsequently relegated on goal difference as they finished level on points with Kastrioti.

Stadia and last season

League table

Results

Season statistics

Top scorers

Notes

References

Kategoria Superiore seasons
1
Albanian Superliga